Wildervanck syndrome or cervico-oculo-acoustic syndrome comprises a triad of:
 Duane syndrome
 Klippel-Feil anomaly (fused cervical vertebrae)
 congenital hearing loss

Wildervanck syndrome is a developmental disorder that may be characterized by accessory tragi.

References

External links 

Syndromes affecting hearing
Medical triads
Rare diseases